Dennis van der Ree (born 19 April 1979) is a Dutch football coach and former player. He is the manager of FC Groningen in the Eredivisie league.

Playing career
A right back, his first professional club was FC Utrecht, where he played from 1997 until 2002, one exception was the 1999–2000 season where he played with NAC Breda. He left for the amateurs and played with SHO, returning to professional football the following season. He played for four years, from 2003 until 2007, for AGOVV Apeldoorn. He then played for SC Cambuur from 2007 to 2012, retiring after a short stint at AGOVV Apeldoorn.

Coaching career
In June 2022, he was unveiled as a new assistant coach at FC Groningen. On 2 December 2022, following the dismissal of Frank Wormuth as head coach, FC Groningen announced to have appointed van der Ree as a head coach on an interim basis. He was confirmed as permanent head coach until the end of the 2022–23 season on 2 January 2023.

References

1979 births
Living people
Dutch footballers
FC Utrecht players
SC Cambuur players
AGOVV Apeldoorn players
NAC Breda players
Eredivisie players
Eerste Divisie players
Footballers from Rotterdam
BVV Barendrecht players
Association football defenders
Zwart-Wit '28 players
FC Twente non-playing staff
Dutch football managers
FC Groningen managers
Eredivisie managers